Korkuyorum Anne! (English title: Mommy, I'm Scared!) is a 2004 Turkish comedy film written and directed by Reha Erdem. An alternate title for the film is İnsan nedir ki? (What is a human anyway?).

Main cast 
 Ali Düşenkalkar as Ali
 Turgay Aydın as Keten
 Şenay Gürler as İpek
 Işıl Yücesoy as Neriman
 Arzu Bazman as Omit
 Köksal Engür as Rasih

External links
 Korkuyorum Anne! at IMDb

2004 films
2004 comedy films
2000s Turkish-language films
Golden Orange Behlül Dal Jury Special Award winners
Films set in Turkey
Turkish black comedy films